Marcin "Abradab" Marten (born 12 November 1978 in Katowice) is a Polish rapper and music producer. Marten is a founding member of Polish hip-hop group Kaliber 44 and, since 2002, a solo artist. He is a member of Polish Society of the Phonographic Industry (Związek Producentów Audio Video, ZPAV). Marten is a winner of two Fryderyk awards. In 2011, Machina magazine placed Marten at No.17 on the list of 30 best Polish rappers. He has also collaborated with artists like Piotr Banach, Bosski Roman, Maciej Maleńczuk, Wojciech Waglewski, Grubson, L.U.C and O.S.T.R.

History

Kaliber 44 (1994–2001) 

In 1994, Marcin Marten formed Kaliber 44 together with his brother Michał "Joka" Marten. The group was joined by Piotr Łuszcz performing under pseudonym Mag Magik I. In 1995, Kaliber 44 was signed to S. P. Records, and a year later their debut album Księga Tajemnicza. Prolog was released. In 1998, after the group recorded its second album W 63 minuty dookoła świata, Piotr "Magik" Łuszcz left the band and formed Paktofonika. Kaliber 44's third album 3:44 was released in 2000.

Solo career (2002–present) 
After the release of 3:44, Abradab started his solo career. On 6 June 2004, he released his first solo album Czerwony album through S. P. Records. The album charted at No.21 on OLiS. The album featured a popular song titled "Rapowe ziarno 2 (Szyderap)", for which a music video was released. The album won Fryderyk award in the "Album of the Year - Hip-Hop/R&B" category, while "Rapowe Ziarno 2 (Szyderap)" received a nomination in the "Video of the Year" category.

Abradab's second album   was released on 1 December 2005 and featured guest appearances by rapper Numer Raz and Abradab's brother Joka. The album peaked at No.42 on OLiS. Both albums received nominations for Fryderyk award.

On 4 October 2010, the fourth solo record by Abradab was released. The album, titled Abradabing and produced by rapper O.S.T.R., received a Fryderyk award for Hip-hop/R&B Album of the Year. Marten's fifth studio album, ExtraVertik, was released on 21 April 2012 through Abradab's record label Inna-My-Twórnia.

Discography

Solo albums

Music videos

Awards and nominations

Fryderyk

|-
| rowspan="2"|2004|| Czerwony album || Album of the Year - Hip-Hop/R&B || 
|-
| "Rapowe Ziarno 2 (Szyderap)" || Video of the Year || 
|-
| 2006|| Emisja spalin || rowspan="3"| Album of the Year - Hip-Hop/R&B || 
|-
| 2009 || Ostatni poziom kontroli || 
|-
| rowspan=2 | 2011 || Abradabing || 
|-
| Męskie granie (with Smolik, Maleńczuk, Waglewski, Mitch&Mitch, Pogodno, Fisz Emade, Kim Nowak, DJ Eprom, OXY.GEN, Voo Voo, Jacaszek) || Album of the Year - Alternative || 
|-

Superjedynki

|-
| 2005 || Czerwony album || rowspan="2"| Album hip-hop || 
|-
| 2006 || Emisja spalin || 
|-

External links
 Official website

References 

1978 births
Living people
Musicians from Katowice
Polish rappers
Polish record producers